The following is a list of players and who appeared in at least one game for the Louisville Colonels franchise of Major League Baseball from  through . This includes the Louisville Eclipse of the American Association, as well as the Colonels of both the AA and the National League. Players in bold are in the Baseball Hall of Fame.



A
Nick Altrock 
Bill Anderson
Wally Andrews

B
Norm Baker
Charley Bassett
Burley Bayer
Ollie Beard
Charlie Bell
Ned Bligh
Charlie Bohn
George Boone
Amos Booth
George Borchers
Eddie Boyle
Kitty Brashear
Grant Briggs
Dan Brouthers
Lew Brown
Tom Brown
William Brown
Pete Browning
Hercules Burnett
Dick Butler

C
Tom Cahill
Scoops Carey
Fred Carl
Pete Cassidy
Elton Chamberlain
Bill Childress
Bob Clark
Win Clark
Dad Clarke
Fred Clarke
Josh Clarke
Fritz Clausen
Monk Cline
Billy Clingman
Hub Collins
Jimmy Collins
John Connor
Paul Cook
Henry Cote
Harry Croft
Jack Crooks
Amos Cross
Joe Cross
Lave Cross
Joe Crotty
Billy Crowell
Bert Cunningham

D
Ed Daily
Jack Darragh
Harry Davis
Ren Deagle
George Decker
Tom Delahanty
Jerry Denny
Charlie Dexter
Buttercup Dickerson
Joe Dolan
Patsy Donovan
Harry Dooms
John Doran
Pete Dowling
Tom Dowse
Denny Driscoll
Sam Dungan
John Dyler

E
Billy Earle
Henry Easterday
Red Ehret
Bones Ely
Charlie Emig
Dude Esterbrook
Frank Eustace
Roy Evans
John Ewing

F
Clay Fauver
Charles Fisher
Warren Fitzgerald
Pat Flaherty
Patsy Flaherty
Ed Flanagan
Paddy Fox
Chick Fraser
Frank Freund
Eddie Fusselback

G
John Galligan
Mike Gaule
Billy Geer
Joe Gerhardt
Tom Gettinger
Pete Gilbert
Jack Glasscock
Bill Gleason
Jack Gleason
Herb Goodall
John Grim
Billy Gumbert

H
Irv Hach
Charlie Hamburg
Jerry Harrington
Topsy Hartsel
Bill Hassamaer
Gil Hatfield
John Healy
Guy Hecker
Jack Heinzman
George Hemming
Ducky Hemp
Art Herman
Bill Hill
Ducky Holmes
Dummy Hoy
Rudy Hulswitt
Bill Hunter

I
Bert Inks
John Irwin

J
Hughie Jennings
Abbie Johnson
Alex Jones
Jim Jones
Mike Jones
Ri Jones

K
Mike Kelley
Bill Kemmer
Ted Kennedy
John Kerins
Fred Ketcham
Matt Kilroy
Tom Kinslow
Malachi Kittridge
Bill Kling
Phil Knell
Joe Kostal
Charlie Krehmeyer
Bill Kuehne

L
Fred Lake
Bob Langsford
Sam LaRocque
Juice Latham
Tacks Latimer
Tommy Leach
Jack Leary
Thomas Long
Jim Long
Pat Luby
Con Lucid
Henry Luff
Luke Lutenberg

M
Denny Mack
Reddy Mack
Bill Magee
Lou Mahaffey
Frank Martin
Harry Maskrey
Leech Maskrey
Al Mays
Harry McCaffery
Barry McCormick
Tom McCreery
Mike H. McDermott
Mike J. McDermott
Alex McFarlan
Dan McFarlan
Herm McFarland
Ambrose McGann
Tom McLaughlin
George Meakim
Jouett Meekin
Jock Menefee
Ed Merrill
Bill Merritt
Tom Messitt
Bert Miller
Doggie Miller
Joe Miller
Dan Minnehan
Tom Morrison
Tony Mullane
Clarence Murphy
Miah Murray

N
Kid Nance
Joe Neale
George Nicol

O
John O'Brien
Dan O'Connor
Tim O'Rourke

P
Harrison Peppers
Pat Pettee
Fred Pfeffer
Dan Phelan
Deacon Phillippe
Ollie Pickering
Gracie Pierce
George Pinkney
Doc Powers
Walt Preston
Walter Prince

Q

R
Toad Ramsey
Harry Raymond
John Reccius
Phil Reccius
Nick Reeder
Billy Rhines
Danny Richardson
John Richter
Claude Ritchey
Jim Rogers
Chief Roseman
Bill Rotes
Jack Ryan

S
Ben Sanders
Jimmy Say
Al Schellhase
Bill Schenck
Harry Scherer
Ossee Schreckengost
Emmett Seery
Dan Shannon
Frank Shannon
Tim Shinnick
Frank Shugart
Harry Smith
Heinie Smith
Ollie Smith
Pop Smith
Skyrocket Smith
Tom Smith
Cooney Snyder
Harry Spies
Ed Springer
General Stafford
Farmer Steelman
Len Stockwell
Tom Stouch
Sammy Strang
Scott Stratton
Joe Strauss
Charles Strick
Dan Sullivan
Sleeper Sullivan
Tom Sullivan
Dan Sweeney
Pete Sweeney
Lou Sylvester

T
Billy Taylor
Harry Taylor
Tom Terrell
Frank Todd
Phil Tomney
John Traffley
George Treadway
Mike Trost
Larry Twitchell

U

V
Farmer Vaughn
Peek-A-Boo Veach
Lee Viau

W
Rube Waddell
Jack Wadsworth
Honus Wagner
John Warner
Farmer Weaver
Sam Weaver
Pete Weckbecker
Curt Welch
Tub Welch
Jack Wentz
Perry Werden
Joe Werrick
Gus Weyhing
Lew Whistler
Bill White
Ed Whiting
Bill Whitrock
Harry Wilhelm
Dave Wills
Bill Wilson
George Winkleman
Jimmy Wolf
Walt Woods
Joe Wright

Y

Z
Fred Zahner
Chief Zimmer

External links
Baseball Reference

Major League Baseball all-time rosters
Louisville Colonels, Roster